The Mission Church of the Annunciation is a Church of England church in Walsall, West Midlands.  Within the parish of St Gabriel's, Fullbrook, it serves the Tamebrige and Yew Tree estate, built by West Bromwich Council in 1956.

History 
The church was dedicated by Rt Revd Stretton Reeve, Bishop of Lichfield, on 27 March 1958. The building was designed to be dual-purpose, with a sanctuary at one end and a stage at the other, with both capable of being curtained-off.

Clergy

Vicars who have served The Annunciation 
1958 - 1971         Fr S. Thomas

1972 - 2010         Fr T R H Coyne

2011 - present     Rev Prebendary Mark McIntyre CMP SSC

Assistant priests 
1958 - 1961        Fr E Booth

1967 - 1970        Fr K Hill

1970 - 1973        Fr H Pascoe

1974 - 1977        Fr N Clapp

1977 - 1978        Fr C Marshall

1980 - 1983        Fr B Williams

1988 - 1990        Fr G Matthews

1990                   Fr D Pearce

1995 - 2004        Fr W Poultney

2000 - 2003        Fr E Davies

2005 - 2010        Fr N Pierce

2013 - 2016        Fr S Oakes

2019 - 2022        Fr R Hume

References

External links 
St Gabriel's Church, Walsall

 The Church of the Annunciation : A Church Near You

Annunciation
Church of England church buildings in the West Midlands (county)
Churches completed in 1939
20th-century Church of England church buildings
Buildings and structures in Walsall
Walsall
Walsall